Eldar Allakhverdiyev is a retired Soviet and Ukrainian football player.

Career
Eldar Allakhverdiyev, started his career in 1997 at Borysfen Boryspil in Kyiv until 1999, where he played 35 games and scoring 3 goals. In 1998 he played also 3 matches with Mykolaiv. He made his debut on 3 April 1999 during the match Metallurg (Mariupol) - SC Nikolaev, 3: 0. Then he played in the Ukrainian Second League clubs Ros Bila Tserkva and in 2001 he moved to Desna Chernihiv, the main club of Chernihiv. Since 2004 he has played in amateur and futsal teams. He spent some time in the Polish championship team.

Honours
Borysfen Boryspil
 Ukrainian Second League: 1999–2000

References

External links 
 Eldar Allakhverdiyev allplayers.in.ua

1978 births
Living people
Soviet footballers
Ukrainian footballers
FC Desna Chernihiv players
FC Borysfen Boryspil players
MFC Mykolaiv players
FC Ros Bila Tserkva players
FC Sokil Zolochiv players
Ukrainian Second League players
Ukrainian First League players
Ukrainian Premier League players
Ukrainian expatriate sportspeople in Poland
Association football forwards